; born 3. October 1901 in Denga (today: Fukui prefecture); died 29. June 1955) was a Japanese author. Most of her works belong to the genre of Japanese „I-Novel“ (Shishōsetsu).

Life and Work 
Shizue was born in 1901 as an illegitimate daughter of a shinto priest in Denga (today Fukui prefecture). In 1908 she moved for three to Taiwan with her father, where he worked as high priest in a shinto shrine. After a brief stay in Japan in 1911, the family returned to Taiwan. Shizue visited a nursing school, finishing her apprenticeship as a nurse in 1916  and subsequently started working in a hospital. She got married at 17 to a railway employee 13 years her senior, who worked at train station Taichung in Taiwan. In 1921 Shizue separated from him and went back to Ōsaka, Japan where she lived with her grandparents.

First Shizue was a stenographer, then she began to work as a journalist for the Mainichi Shimbun in Mainichi Shimbun. During this time she got to know author and stage performer Iruru Masaoka (1904–1958). She planned double suicide for love shinjū with him but it failed. In 1927 she became the lover of Mushanokōji Saneatsu. He encouraged her to write and so in the same year she published her first piece Ekichō no wakaki tsuma (roughly: „The Stationmaster's young wife“) in number 8 of Daichōwa magazine. After this she made her official debut in the world of literature with a novel called Kozakana no kokoro, which was equally valued by Saneatsu and Nakamura Chihei alike.

Shizue published a series of articles in a magazine called Josei geijutsu (roughly: „Women's Art“), edited by Shigure Hasegawa. After she got separated from Saneatsu, she had brief relationships with Kikuchi Kan and Nakamura Chihei, but married neither of them. With Nakamura she went to Taiwan again in 1939, where she stayed for the next 18 years. In 1942 she married the author Gishū Nakayama, and then divorced him four years later. Post-war she published a few pieces in the newspaper Kagami until this was cancelled after the third issue. After that she was responsible for an advice-column at Yomiuri Shinbun, targeted at young girls affected by the Atomic bombings of Hiroshima and Nagasaki (Hibakusha). John Hersey described her short stories as being about "the bitter loves and bitter solitude of women". While in Hiroshima, she started a campaign for funds in the Yomiuri for hibakusha girls to receive plastic surgery in Tokyo or Osaka.

In 1953 she travelled to Europe and saw the Coronation of Elizabeth II and took part in a meeting of the PEN International.

Shizue died in 1955 due to lung cancer in Koishikawa university hospital in Tokyo at age 53. Although she became a catholic before her death, she chose to be buried at Tōkei-ji in Kita-Kamakura  founded in 1285 by a monk who felt sorry for women with cruel husbands.

Works (Selection) 
 1939 Hinadori
 1940 Sono ato no kōfuku
 1940 Aijō no mon
 1940 Rekishi monogatari hakkō no himemiya
 1941 Nampo kikō
 1943 Haha to tsuma
 1948 Kaen
 1948 Utsukushii hito

Footnotes

References

External links 

 http://www.asahi-net.or.jp/~pb5h-ootk/pages/SAKKA/ma/masugishizue.html
 http://www.kamakurabungaku.com/literature/w100_7.html
 http://www.tenri-u.ac.jp/tngai/taiwan/201704liao.pdf

20th-century Japanese novelists
People of the Empire of Japan
1901 births
1955 deaths